Emmanuel A. Mapunda (10 December 1935 – 16 May 2019) was a Tanzanian Roman Catholic prelate. Born in Parangu, Mapunda was ordained to the priesthood in 1965.

Mapunda died on 15 May 2019, at the age of 83.

References

1935 births
2019 deaths
21st-century Roman Catholic bishops in Tanzania
20th-century Roman Catholic bishops in Tanzania
Roman Catholic bishops of Mbinga